Landy Wen (Atayal: Yungai Hayung) is a Taiwanese singer.

In 2010, she was cast in a TV drama based on the Bret Easton Ellis novel Less Than Zero, to be set in Taipei.

Discography 
 (1999) Sixth Sense (第六感)
 (2001) A Little Wild (有點野)
 (2002) Blue Rain (藍色雨)
 (2004) The Wen Effect (溫式效應)
 (2005) Love Comes Back (New + Best Selection) (愛回溫)
 (2007) Hot Wave (热浪)
 (2008) High Q (EP) (魔力 High Q)
 (2009) Dancing Queen
 (2012) Landing
 (2013) Landy 10th Album (溫嵐 同名概念專輯)
 (2015) Love Myself (愛上自己)
 (2022) Crazy (EP) (瘋)

Filmography

Film

References

1979 births
Atayal people
Living people
21st-century Taiwanese singers
21st-century Taiwanese actresses
Taiwanese television actresses
Taiwanese film actresses
Taiwanese Mandopop singers
People from Hsinchu County
21st-century Taiwanese women singers